John Buckmaster may refer to:
 John C. Buckmaster (1914–1995), English actor, father of Paul Buckmaster
 John R. Buckmaster (1915–1983), English actor
 John D. Buckmaster (born 1941), American engineer and physicist